Mark Jeremy Outterside (born 13 January 1967) is a former footballer who made 39 appearances in the Football League playing as a right back for Sunderland and Darlington. He went on to play non-league football for clubs including Blyth Spartans, Newcastle Blue Star, Whitley Bay, Hebburn and Consett.

References

1967 births
Living people
Sportspeople from Hexham
Footballers from Northumberland
English footballers
Association football defenders
Sunderland A.F.C. players
Darlington F.C. players
Blyth Spartans A.F.C. players
Newcastle Blue Star F.C. players
Whitley Bay F.C. players
Consett A.F.C. players
English Football League players
Hebburn Town F.C. players